Princess Adelaide of Saxe-Meiningen (Adelaide Erna Caroline Marie Elisabeth; 16 August 1891 – 25 April 1971), later Princess Adalbert of Prussia, was a daughter of Prince Frederick John of Saxe-Meiningen and his wife Countess Adelaide of Lippe-Biesterfeld.

Family
Adelaide (original )'s father Prince Frederick was a younger son of George II of Saxe-Meiningen by his second wife Feodora of Hohenlohe-Langenburg. She had five siblings, including Prince George, a prisoner of war killed during World War II, and Prince Bernard.

Adelaide's mother, also named Adelaide, was the eldest child of Ernst, Count of Lippe-Biesterfeld, who was the Regent of the principality of Lippe for seven years (1897–1904).

Marriage
On 3 August 1914, at the beginning of World War I, Adelaide married Prince Adalbert of Prussia at Wilhelmshaven, Schleswig-Holstein, Germany. He was the third son of Kaiser William II of Germany. Adelaide's father would die within a month, on 23 August 1914. Less than a month after their marriage, Prince Adalbert was reported to have been killed in battle in Brussels. This was only a rumor however, and the prince had been unharmed. In March 1915, he was promoted to Captain in the navy and Major in the army.

She and Prince Adalbert had three children:

Princess Victoria Marina of Prussia (stillborn, 4 September 1915) she died soon after birth, although Adelaide was reported to have been in "satisfactory condition".
Princess Victoria Marina of Prussia (11 September 1917 – 21 January 1981) she married Kirby Patterson (24 July 1907–4 June 1984) on 26 September 1947. They had three children and one grandson:
Berengar Orin Bernhard Kirby Patterson (21 August 1948-18 May 2011) he married Pamela Knight in 1994.
Marina Adelaide Emily Patterson (21 August 1948-10 January 2011) she married John Engel on 24 September 1982. They had one son:
William John Engel (17 February 1983)
Dohna Maria Patterson (7 August 1954) she married Stephen Pearl on 28 July 1974. 
Prince Wilhelm Victor of Prussia (15 February 1919 – 7 February 1989), he married at Donaueschingen on 20 July 1944 Marie Antoinette, Countess of Hoyos (Hohenthurm, 27 June 1920 – Marbella, 1 March 2004). They had two children, five grandchildren and one great-grandson.

Later life
After William II abdicated in 1918 at the end of World War I, Prince Adalbert sought refuge on his yacht, which had been maintained by a loyal crew. Princess Adelaide and their children soon attempted to follow, travelling by train from Kiel. They were delayed however, and eventually came to be staying in southern Bavaria with Prince Henry of Bavaria (a grandson of Ludwig III of Bavaria) and his wife. She and Prince Adalbert were later reunited.

Princess Adelaide died on 25 April 1971 in La Tour-de-Peilz, Switzerland. Her husband had died 23 years earlier, on 22 September 1948, at the same location.

Ancestry

References

1891 births
1971 deaths
Nobility from Kassel
People from Hesse-Nassau
House of Saxe-Meiningen
Prussian princesses
House of Hohenzollern
Princesses of Saxe-Meiningen